Issouf Bemba Sissokho (born 30 January 2002) is a Malian professional footballer who plays as a midfielder for  club Bordeaux.

Club career
On 30 January 2020, Sissokho signed with a contract with Bordeaux. Sissokho made his professional debut with Bordeaux in a 2–1 Ligue 1 loss to Metz on 27 February 2021.

International career
Sissokho represented the Mali U20s at the 2019 African Games.

References

External links
 
 Formation Girondins Profile

2002 births
Living people
Sportspeople from Bamako
Malian footballers
Mali youth international footballers
Association football midfielders
FC Girondins de Bordeaux players
Ligue 1 players
Ligue 2 players
Championnat National 3 players
Malian expatriate footballers
Malian expatriates in France
Expatriate footballers in France
21st-century Malian people